Cozzens is a surname. Notable people with the surname include:

Andrew Cozzens, American prelate of the Roman Catholic Church
Donald Cozzens (1939–2021), American Roman Catholic priest, former president-rector and professor of pastoral theology 
Frederick Swartwout Cozzens (1818–1869), American humorist
James Gould Cozzens (1903–1978), American novelist
Mildred Cozzens Turner (1897-1992) American artist, composer and singer
William C. Cozzens (1811–1876), American politician

See also
Cozzens House Hotel, later known as the Canfield House, a pioneer hotel in Omaha, Nebraska, United States